Glossolepis dorityi, the Grime rainbowfish, is a species of rainbowfish native to the Grime River region in northern West Papua.

Distribution and habitat
The species is known only from two lakes in the Grime river system. It was last caught in 2008, and may now be extinct in the wild, due to the threat of aquaculture and competition with non-native species of tilapia and carp. Captive bred individuals can be found in the aquarium trade, however.

The locality in which the species is found is a floodplain, covered with small round lakes. The fish are more abundant where the aquatic vegetation is dense. There has been extensive habitat modification due to an expanding human population.

Description
Individuals of Glossolepis dorityi are greenish, with orange stripes between regular rows of large scales. The stripes are especially prominent during courtship. Males have deeper bodies, and females lack the stripes between scale rows.

Biology and behaviour
The species is schooling, and feeds on various plants and insects. During breeding, pairs of fish come together on the riverbed. After the young hatch, they are abandoned. The juvenile fish are 4mm long, and feed on microscopic inveterbrates and plants until they mature.

References

External links

dorityi
Fish described in 2001
Taxa named by Gerald R. Allen